Arnold Fanck (6 March 1889 – 28 September 1974) was a German film director and pioneer of the mountain film genre. He is best known for the extraordinary alpine footage he captured in such films as The Holy Mountain (1926), The White Hell of Pitz Palu (1929), Storm over Mont Blanc (1930), The White Ecstasy (1931), and S.O.S. Eisberg (1933). Fanck was also instrumental in launching the careers of several filmmakers during the Weimar years in Germany, including Leni Riefenstahl, Luis Trenker, and cinematographers Sepp Allgeier, Richard Angst, Hans Schneeberger, and Walter Riml.

Biography

Arnold Fanck was born on 6 March 1889 in Frankenthal, Germany.

Together with Odo Deodatus Tauern, Bernhard Villinger and Rolf Bauer, Fanck established the company "Berg- und Sportfilm GmbH Freiburg" in Freiburg im Breisgau in 1920. Fanck, who held a PhD in geology, directed mountain films, sports films and ski films. He was assisted by Sepp Allgeier, a cameraman who later worked with Leni Riefenstahl, and worked mostly in the Alps in locations such as the Engadine, Zermatt and the Arlberg and on mountains such as Mont Blanc and Piz Palü. 

His most popular and successful films of the period between the wars include The Holy Mountain (1926), The White Hell of Pitz Palu (1929), Storm over Mont Blanc (1930), The White Ecstasy (1931), and S.O.S. Eisberg (1933)—all starring Leni Riefenstahl.

During the Nazi regime, Fanck got in trouble with propaganda minister Joseph Goebbels, since he refused to cooperate — apparently because of the necessity of joining the party. In 1934, he also began working on his film, The Eternal Dream, which not only starred a French hero in French mountains, but also had a Jewish producer, Gregor Rabinovitch. This conflict brought Fanck into economic difficulties, from which he was only able to escape by accepting a contract from the Japanese ministry of culture in 1936. 

With The Daughter of the Samurai and other "culture films", Fanck decided to cooperate with the Nazi regime. Soon afterwards, he produced A German Robinson Crusoe (1938/40) a propaganda film for Bavaria Filmkunst. Arnold Fanck joined the NSDAP in April 1940.

In 1944 he made a documentary about the sculptor Arno Breker called Arno Breker – Harte Zeit, starke Kunst. After World War II, Fanck's main films made during the regime were proscribed by the Allied military governments. Fanck received no further job offers and went to work as a lumberjack.

After the screening of his film The Eternal Dream at the mountain film festival in Trento in 1957, Fanck was once again recognized for his artistic achievements. In order to survive his economic difficulties, however, he was forced to sell the rights to his films to a friend, until TV broadcasts improved his situation. 

Fanck died on 28 September 1974 in Freiburg im Breisgau, Germany, at the age of 85. He is buried in the Hauptfriedhof in Freiburg.

Filmography
  (1920, documentary)
  (1921)
 Das Wunder des Schneeschuhs, 2. Teil – Eine Fuchsjagd auf Skiern durchs Engadin (1922)
 Pömperlys Kampf mit dem Schneeschuh (co-director: Holger-Madsen, 1922)
 Mountain of Destiny (1924)
  (1924, short documentary)
 Die weiße Kunst (dir. Sepp Allgeier, 1925, documentary)
 The Holy Mountain (1926)
 The Great Leap (1927)
 Struggle for the Matterhorn (dir. Mario Bonnard and Nunzio Malasomma, 1928), co-wrote
 The White Stadium (1928, documentary)
 Milak, the Greenland Hunter (dir.
 The White Hell of Pitz Palu (co-director: G. W. Pabst, 1929)
 Storm over Mont Blanc (1930)
 The White Ecstasy (1931)
 S.O.S. Eisberg (1933)
 North Pole, Ahoy (dir. Andrew Marton, 1934)
 Die Seehunde (1934, short)
 The Eternal Dream (1934)
 The Daughter of the Samurai (1937)
 Winterreise durch Südmandschurien (1938, short documentary)
 Kaiserbauten in Fernost (1938, short documentary)
 Hänschen Klein (1938, short)
 A German Robinson Crusoe (1940)
 Kampf um den Berg (1941, short) 
  (1943, short documentary)
  (1944, short documentary)
 Atlantik-Wall (1944, short documentary)

Retrospective films
 In Eis und Schnee – Der Filmregisseur Arnold Fanck (1997) directed by Hans-Jürgen Panitz
 Zwischen weißem Rausch und Abgrund: Über Arnold Fanck, den Extremregisseur (1998) directed by Andreas Berg

References 
Notes

Bibliography

 Fanck, Arnold; Schneider, Hannes (1925) Wunder des Schneeschuhs; ein System des richtigen Skilaufens und seine Anwendung im alpinen Geländelauf, Hamburg: Gebrüder Enoch. ; reprint 
 Baader, Ernst Wilhelm; Schneeberger, Hans; Allgeier, Sepp; Fanck, Arnold; Arató, Gyula (1926) Wunder des Schneeschuhs [2] Sprunglauf, Langlauf, Hamburg: Gebrüder Enoch
 Fanck, Arnold (1929) Die bruchlose Deformation von Fossilien durch tektonischen Druck und ihr Einfluss auf die Bestimmung der Arten. Beobachtet und bearbeitet an den Pelecypoden der St. Galler Meeresmolasse. Zürich: Fretz
 Fanck, Arnold (1932) Das Bilderbuch des Skiläufers. - 284 kinematografische Bilder vom Skilauf mit Erläuterungen und einer Einführung in eine neue Bewegungs-Fotografie. Hamburg: Gebrüder Enoch
 Fanck, Arnold (1973) Er fuhrte Regie mit Gletschern, Sturmen und Lawinen; ein Filmpionier erzahlt München: Nymphenburger Verlagshandlung 
 Haarstark, Gunther (1990) Dramatische Berge. Der Filmregisseur Dr. Arnold Fanck, Frankfurt M., Magisterarbeit
 Horak, Jan-Christopher with Pichler, Gisela, eds. (1997) Berge, Licht und Traum. Dr. Arnold Fanck und der deutsche Bergfilm München: Bruckmann 
 Rapp, Christian (1997) Höhenrausch. Der deutsche Bergfilm Wien: Sonderzahl
 Bock, Hans-Michael and Bergfelder, Tim (eds) (2009) The Concise Cinegraph: Encyclopaedia of German Cinema Berghahn Books  pg 116 - 117
 Fanck, Matthias (2009) Arnold Fanck. Weisse Hölle – weisser Rausch. Bergfilme und Bergbilder 1909 – 1939. AS-Verlag, Zürich 
 Inkster, Darlene (2012) Film Pioneers: Arnold Fanck pg 18-21 in Directory of World Cinema: Germany edited by Michelle Langford, Intellect Books 
 Haque, Kamaal (2012) Genre of the Mountain Film in A New History of German Cinema edited by Jennifer M. Kapczynski, Michael David Richardson; Boydell & Brewe   pp 142–147

External links
Photo Gallery

The case of Arnold Fanck by Béla Balázs
Article by Thomas Staedeli
Film's Role in Popularizing Alpine Skiing in America by Rick Moulton
The Artistic Films of Arnold Fanck, the Apostle of Skiing and High-Mountain Climbing by Donald G. Daviau
Arnold Fanck biography, filmography and photos at filmportal.de
Arnold Fanck at MUBI
 
Der weisse Rausch. Actor Walter Riml as the tall Hamburger carpenter

Mountaineering film directors
Nazi propagandists
People from the Palatinate (region)
Film people from Freiburg im Breisgau
1889 births
1974 deaths